The Ministry of Truth, the Ministry of Peace, the Ministry of Love, and the Ministry of Plenty are the four ministries of the government of Oceania in the 1949 dystopian novel Nineteen Eighty-Four, by George Orwell.

The use of contradictory names in this manner may have been inspired by the British and American governments; during the Second World War, the British Ministry of Food oversaw rationing (the name "Ministry of Food Control" was used in World War I) and the Ministry of Information restricted and controlled information, rather than supplying it; while, in the U.S., the War Department was abolished and replaced with the "National Military Establishment" in 1947 and then became the Department of Defense in 1949, right around the time that Nineteen Eighty-Four was published.

Ministry of Truth

The Ministry of Truth (Newspeak: Minitrue) is the ministry of propaganda. As with the other ministries in the novel, the name Ministry of Truth is a misnomer because in reality it serves the opposite: it is responsible for any necessary falsification of historical events. However, like the other ministries, the name is also apt because it decides what "truth" is in Oceania.

As well as administering "truth", the ministry spreads a new language amongst the populace called Newspeak, in which, for example, "truth" is understood to mean statements like  when the situation warrants. In keeping with the concept of doublethink, the ministry is thus aptly named in that it creates/manufactures "truth" in the Newspeak sense of the word. The book describes the doctoring of historical records to show a government-approved version of events.

Description
Winston Smith, the main character of the novel, works at the Ministry of Truth. It is an enormous pyramidal structure of glittering white concrete rising 300 metres (980 ft) into the air, containing over 3000 rooms above ground. On the outside wall are the three slogans of the Party: "WAR IS PEACE," "FREEDOM IS SLAVERY," and "IGNORANCE IS STRENGTH." There is also a large part underground, probably containing huge incinerators where documents are destroyed after they are put down memory holes. For his description, Orwell was inspired by the Senate House at the University of London.

Role in information
The Ministry of Truth is involved with news media, entertainment, the fine arts and educational books. Its purpose is to rewrite history to change the facts to fit Party doctrine for propaganda effect. For example, if Big Brother makes a prediction that turns out to be wrong, the employees of the Ministry of Truth correct the record to make it accurate. This is the "how" of the Ministry of Truth's existence. Within the novel, Orwell elaborates that the deeper reason for its existence, the "why", is to maintain the illusion that the Party is absolute. It cannot ever seem to change its mind (if, for instance, they perform one of their constant changes regarding enemies during war) or make a mistake (firing an official or making a grossly misjudged supply prediction), for that would imply weakness and to maintain power the Party must seem eternally right and strong.

Minitrue plays a role as the news media by changing history, and changing the words in articles about events current and past, so that Big Brother and his government are always seen in a good light and can never do any wrong. The content is more propaganda than actual news.

Departments
The following are the sections or departments of the ministry mentioned in the text:
 Records Department (Newspeak: Recdep)
 Fiction Department (Newspeak: Ficdep)
 Tele-programmes Department (Newspeak: Teledep)
 Pornography section – for Prole consumption only (Newspeak: Pornosec)

Ministry of Peace
The Ministry of Peace (Newspeak: Minipax) serves as the war ministry of Oceania's government, and is in charge of the armed forces, mostly the navy and army. The Ministry of Peace may be the most vital organ of Oceania, seeing as the nation is supposedly in an ongoing genocidal war with either Eurasia or Eastasia and requires the right amount of force not to win the war, but keep it in a state of equilibrium.

As explained in Emmanuel Goldstein's book, The Theory and Practice of Oligarchical Collectivism, the Ministry of Peace revolves around the principle of perpetual war. Perpetual war uses up all surplus resources, keeping most citizens in lives of constant hardship—and thus preventing them from learning enough to comprehend the true nature of their society. Perpetual warfare also "helps preserve the special mental atmosphere that a hierarchical society needs." Since that means the balance of the country rests in the war, the Ministry of Peace is in charge of fighting the war (mostly centred around Africa and India), but making sure to never tip the scales, in case the war should become one-sided. Oceanic telescreens usually broadcast news reports about how Oceania is continually winning every battle it fights, though these reports have little to no credibility.

As with all the other Nineteen Eighty-Four ministries, the Ministry of Peace is named the exact opposite of what it does, since the Ministry of Peace is in charge of maintaining a state of war. The meaning of peace has been equated with the meaning of war in the slogan of the party, "War is Peace". Like the names of other ministries, it also has a literal application: Perpetual war is what keeps the "peace" (the status quo) in Oceania and the balance of power in the world, and since the other major powers also use warfare as a means of maintaining the status quo, the two concepts are functionally identical.

Ministry of Love

The Ministry of Love (Newspeak: Miniluv) serves as Oceania's interior ministry. It enforces loyalty to Big Brother through fear, buttressed through a massive apparatus of security and repression, as well as systematic brainwashing. The Ministry of Love building has no windows and is surrounded by barbed wire entanglements, steel doors, hidden machine-gun nests, and guards armed with "jointed truncheons". Referred to as "the place where there is no darkness", its interior lights are never turned off. It is arguably the most powerful ministry, controlling the will of the population. The Thought Police are a part of Miniluv.

The Ministry of Love, like the other ministries, is misnamed, since it is responsible for the practice and infliction of misery, fear, suffering and torture. In a sense, however, the name is apt, since its ultimate purpose is to instill love of Big Brother—the only form of love permitted in Oceania—in the minds of thoughtcriminals as part of the process of reverting them to orthodox thought. This is typical of the language of Newspeak, in which words and names frequently contain both an idea and its opposite; the orthodox party member is nonetheless able to resolve these contradictions through the disciplined use of doublethink.

Room 101

Room 101, introduced in the climax of the novel, is the basement torture chamber in the Ministry of Love, in which the Party attempts to subject a prisoner to their own worst nightmare, fear or phobia, with the objective of breaking down their resistance.

Such is the purported omniscience of the state in the society of Nineteen Eighty-Four that even a citizen's nightmares are known to the Party. The nightmare, and therefore the threatened punishment, of the protagonist Winston Smith is to be attacked by rats. This is manifested in Room 101 by confronting Smith with a wire cage that contains two large rats. The front of the cage is shaped so that it can fit over a person's face. A trap-door is then opened, allowing the rats to devour the victim's face. This cage is fitted over Smith's face, but he saves himself by begging the authorities to let his lover, Julia, suffer this torture instead of him. The threatened torture, and what Winston is willing to sacrifice to escape it, breaks his last promise to himself and to Julia: never to betray her. (Even though he had confessed to their actions, he still loved her until this point.) The book suggests that Julia is likewise subjected to her own worst fear (although it is not revealed what that fear is), and when she and Winston later meet in a park, he notices a scar on her forehead. The intent of threatening Winston with the rats was to break his spirit by forcing him into betraying the only person he loved, thus eliciting his compliance.

Orwell named Room 101 after a conference room at Broadcasting House where he used to sit through tedious meetings.

Ministry of Plenty

The Ministry of Plenty (Newspeak: Miniplenty) is in control of Oceania's command economy. It oversees rationing of food, supplies, and goods. As told in Goldstein's book, the economy of Oceania is very important, and it is necessary to have the public continually create useless and synthetic supplies or weapons for use in the war, while they have no access to the means of production. This is the central theme of Oceania's idea that a poor, ignorant populace is easier to rule over than a wealthy, well-informed one. Telescreens often make reports on how Big Brother has been able to increase economic production, even when production has actually gone down (see ).

The Ministry hands out statistics which are "nonsense". When Winston is adjusting some Ministry of Plenty's figures, he explains this:

Like the other ministries, the Ministry of Plenty seems to be entirely misnamed, since it is, in fact, responsible for maintaining a state of perpetual poverty, scarcity and financial shortages. However, the name is also apt, because, along with the Ministry of Truth, the Ministry of Plenty's other purpose is to convince the populace that they are living in a state of perpetual prosperity. Orwell made a similar reference to the Ministry of Plenty in his allegorical work Animal Farm when, in the midst of a blight upon the farm, Napoleon the pig orders the silo to be filled with sand, then to place a thin sprinkling of grain on top, which fools human visitors into being dazzled about Napoleon's boasting of the farm's superior economy.

A department of the Ministry of Plenty is charged with organizing state lotteries. These are very popular among the proles, who buy tickets and hope to win the big prizes—a completely vain hope as the big prizes are in fact not awarded at all, the Ministry of Truth participating in the scam and publishing every week the names of non-existent big winners.

In the Michael Radford film adaptation, the ministry is renamed the Ministry of Production, or MiniProd.

Cultural impact
The novel's popularity has resulted in the term "Room 101" being used to represent a place where unpleasant things are done.
 According to Anna Funder's 2002 book Stasiland, Erich Mielke, the last Minister of State Security (Stasi) of East Germany, had the floors of the Stasi headquarters renumbered so that his second floor office would be number 101.
 In the BBC comedy television series Room 101, the concept is radically changed from that of Orwell, and celebrities are invited to discuss their pet hates and persuade the host to consign them to oblivion, as metaphorically represented by the idea of Room 101.

Writer Josh Wilbur proposed a "Ministry of Truth" to combat internet deepfakes and misinformation.

In fiction
In The Ricky Gervais Show, Ricky Gervais and Stephen Merchant play a game called "Room 102", based on the concept of "Room 101", in which Karl Pilkington has to decide what things he dislikes enough to put in Room 102. This would result, according to their game, in these things being erased from existence.

In Terry Gilliam’s 1985 film, Brazil, the alternate dystopian world in which the film is set bears immense similarities to that of Nineteen Eighty-Four, including following an anxious bureaucrat who works at a governmental establishment called the Ministry of Information.

In 1992 cartoon Batman: The Animated Series, the episode "What Is Reality?" had Batman solving one of the Riddler's riddles as taking place in "Room 101" of the police headquarters. There, Batman finds Commissioner Gordon tortured in a virtual reality simulator, and must solve riddles to free him.

In the 2011 Doctor Who episode "The God Complex", the Doctor and his companions find themselves in a hotel full of their own personal Room 101s, each with their greatest fear in it. The Doctor's own room is number 11, which serves as a double entendre, alluding both to the real Room 101, and to the fact that the then-incumbent, Matt Smith, was the eleventh actor to fulfill a starring role as the Doctor.

References

External links
Nineteen Eighty-Four, Internet Archive

Fictional elements introduced in 1949
Nineteen Eighty-Four
Fictional governments
Bureaucracy in fiction